Maria Theresia Fekter is an Austrian politician (ÖVP) and was the Austrian Minister of Finance between 2011 and 2013. Before that, she was Minister of the Interior.

On 27 June 2008, it was announced by her party that she was to be appointed as the new Interior Minister in the Gusenbauer cabinet, following Günther Platter, who became the new Governor of Tyrol. During her career as Interior Minister, she became known as a hardliner, especially when it came to immigration and asylum policies, earning her the unofficial title of an Austrian "Iron Lady".

Because her family made a fortune producing gravel Fekter is often referred to as "Schottermitzi" (roughly translates to "Gravel Mary"; 'Mitzi' is the colloquial nickname form of Mary in Viennese dialect).

Career 
 Doctor of Law, Johannes Kepler University Linz (1979)
 Magistra rerum socialium oeconomicarumque, Johannes Kepler University Linz (1982)
 Engagement in her parents' gravel pit and carrying business (1982—), managing partner (1986—)
 Municipal councillor in Attnang-Puchheim (1986–1990)
 Member of the executive committee (Präsidium) of the Österreichischer Wirtschaftsbund (entrepreneurs' organization of the Austrian People's Party) (1990–2002)
 State Secretary in the Ministry of Economic Affairs (1990–1994)
 Member of the National Council (Parliament) (1994–2007)
 Ombudsman (Volksanwältin) (2007–2008)
 Federal Minister of the Interior (2008–2011)
 Minister of Finance (2011–2013)

Other activities
 Salzburg Festival, member of the board of trustees (since 2013)
 African Development Bank, member of the board of governors (2011–2013)

References

|-

1956 births
Living people
Austrian People's Party politicians
Finance Ministers of Austria
Interior ministers of Austria
Johannes Kepler University Linz alumni
Members of the National Council (Austria)
Ombudsmen in Austria
People from Vöcklabruck District
Female finance ministers
Women government ministers of Austria
Female interior ministers
20th-century Austrian women politicians
20th-century Austrian politicians
21st-century Austrian women politicians
21st-century Austrian politicians